is a Japanese politician of the Liberal Democratic Party, a member of the House of Councillors in the Diet (national legislature). A native of Adachi, Tokyo and graduate of Daito Bunka University, he was elected for the first time in 2004.

Akimoto is affiliated to the openly revisionist lobby Nippon Kaigi.

Late December 2019, Akimoto was arrested for allegedly receiving up to ¥7.6 million in bribes from 500.com, a Chinese gambling operator interested in setting up a casino in the country. On September 7, 2021, the court sentenced him to four years in prison and fined the amount equal to the bribes he had received. He was also found guilty of offering to bribe witnesses to falsify their court testimony. His attorney stated that they will be filing to appeal the case.

See also
China–Japan relations

References

External links 
 Official website in Japanese.

Members of the House of Councillors (Japan)
Living people
1971 births
People from Adachi, Tokyo
Members of Nippon Kaigi
Liberal Democratic Party (Japan) politicians
21st-century Japanese politicians